On 30 July 1997,  Air Littoral Flight 701, an ATR 42 regional turboprop operating a scheduled passenger flight from Nice, France to Florence, Italy, crashed on landing when it  ran off Florence Airport's runway and into a ditch next to a motorway embankment. There were no fatalities among the 14 passengers on board, but the cockpit section was severely damaged, and the captain died of his injuries four days later.

Accident 

At around 10:30 on the day of the accident, following an uneventful flight from Nice, the aircraft prepared to land at Florence's Peretola airport, where the weather was reported as CAVOK, that is good visibility and no cloud; the wind was light and variable. The crew elected to land on runway 23, which has a  displaced threshold. Such choice was described as unusual, in the given conditions; eighty percent of the aircraft operating on the airport that day had landed on the opposite runway, runway 05.

At 10:36 the aircraft was observed touching down far into the runway and at a much higher speed than usual. It then overran the runway end, crashed through the airport perimeter fence and into a ditch next to the nearby A11 motorway. The right engine stopped when the propeller contacted the ground, but the left engine kept running for the following 45 minutes, while rescue operations were taking place.

All passengers were rapidly evacuated, but due to the damage to the cockpit section, it took about an hour to extricate the two crew members. The captain was hospitalised but succumbed to his injures four days later; the first officer and 13 other passengers were injured.

Aircraft 
The aircraft was an ATR 42-500 twin turboprop, with French registration F-GPYE, powered by two Pratt & Whitney Canada PW127 engines. Air Littoral, the launch customer for the model, took delivery of the aircraft the year before, in 1996.

Investigation and trial 
At the time, the Italian air accident investigation agency, the Agenzia Nazionale per la Sicurezza del Volo, had not been established yet, therefore the matter was referred to the Italian Civil Aviation Authority and to the public prosecutor.

It emerged that during the landing, the first officer was the pilot flying, and was undergoing line training under the captain's supervision. The prosecutor determined that the final approach was conducted at an excessive speed and rate of descent, even triggering the associated on-board warning system, which was ignored. No technical defects were found in the aircraft.

The first officer and two managers from Air Littoral – the head of training and the head of human resources – were charged with manslaughter and causing an air disaster, but were acquitted in November 2003. The responsibility for the crash was ultimately placed on the captain, and his "imprudent" decision to proceed with the landing despite the unsafe approach.

Legacy
The accident highlighted the limitations of Florence's Peretola airport, which is geographically constrained between the A11 motorway and  Mount Morello. The event was cited during the following years as argument against proposals to further develop the airport, with opponents recommending to expand nearby Pisa Airport instead.

See also 
 List of accidents and incidents involving commercial aircraft
 Bangkok Airways Flight 266

References

External links 
 

1997 in Italy
Aviation accidents and incidents in 1997
Airliner accidents and incidents in Italy
Accidents and incidents involving the ATR 42
1997 disasters in Italy